"The Box" is a song by avant-garde band King Missile. It appears on the band's 1988 album They.

Content
In "The Box," frontman John S. Hall sings a story in which a male subject is placed in a box, given various toys to play with, instructed to be creative, and told that he will be let out of the box if he follows his instructions. Although the subject performs his assigned tasks "incredibly well," his captors do not let him out of the box. As the music crescendoes, Hall repeatedly screams, "They lie!"

The lyrics may be an allegory for the way some children are cheated by the American educational system.

Music video
The video for "The Box" was directed for $100 by Winchester Chimes.

References

King Missile songs
Experimental rock songs
1988 singles
Songs written by John S. Hall
1988 songs